Reichenstein Castle is a castle in the municipality of Arlesheim in the canton of Basel-Land in Switzerland.  It is a Swiss heritage site of national significance.

It is one of four castles on a slope called Birseck that confines the plain of the Birs river and is the sister castle to Birseck Castle.

1245-1813 the castle was a property of the Swiss noble family Reich von Reichenstein. This family hold also the Château de Landskron (France) and Inzlingen Castle (Germany).

See also
 List of castles in Switzerland

References

External links
 

Cultural property of national significance in Basel-Landschaft
Castles in Basel-Landschaft